Guga may refer to:

Guga River (Papua New Guinea)
Guga, a tributary of the river Iad in Romania
Guga, a village in Cășeiu Commune, Cluj County, Romania
Guga (Punjab), a village near to Amritsar in India, where Jassa Singh Ramgarhia was born
Gugga, a figure in Punjabi legend
Aurel Guga (1898-1936), Romanian footballer
Bledion Guga (born 1986), Albanian footballer
Gustavo Kuerten (born 1976), Brazilian tennis player
Guga (footballer, born 1964), Alexandre da Silva, Brazilian footballer
Guga (footballer, born 1977), José Augusto Santana Santos, Brazilian footballer
Guga (footballer, born 1998), Cláudio Rodrigues Gomes, Brazilian footballer
Guga (footballer, born 1997), Gonçalo Rodrigues, Portuguese footballer
Graphical unitary group approach (GUGA), in quantum chemistry